Sujjan Singh may refer to:

Sujjan Singh (golfer), Indian golfer
Sujjan Singh (soldier), Indian soldier